is a 1959 Japanese drama film directed by Koji Shima. It was entered into the 1st Moscow International Film Festival.

Cast
 Fujiko Yamamoto as Saya Ikeda
 Takayoshi Wanami as Minoru, Saya's brother
 Kaoru Kuroiwa as Miyo, Saya's sister
 Toranosuke Ogawa as Gentaro, Grandfather
 Katsuhiko Kobayashi as Jiro Ogura
 Akihiko Katayama as Tokio Noguchi
 Bontaro Miake as Dr. Inoue
 Yoshiro Kitahara as Ichikawa

References

External links
 

1959 films
1959 drama films
Japanese drama films
1950s Japanese-language films
Films directed by Koji Shima
Films set in Yamanashi Prefecture
1950s Japanese films